YEC (Yorkshire Engine Company) was a British motor car. Approximately 50 cars were manufactured in Sheffield from 190708.

History
The Yorkshire Engine Company originally made trams and steam locomotives, but in 1907 began production of automobiles branded 'YEC'. They used Daimler engines, but a legal dispute with the Daimler-Motoren-Gesellschaft ended production in 1908 after approximately 50 vehicles had been built.

Models
Sources describe a 30 HP Mercedes engine model, with front mounted engine and chain-drive to the rear axle; and a model with a 31/55 HP, 8 litre, four-cylinder engine which appeared in 1909.

See also
 List of car manufacturers of the United Kingdom

References

Other sources
 Harald Linz, Halwart Schrader: The International Motor Encyclopedia. : United Soft Media Verlag, Munich 2008, .
 George Nick Georgano (chief editor): The Beaulieu Encyclopedia of the Automobile. Volume 3: . P-Z Fitzroy Dearborn Publishers, Chicago 2001,  . (English)

Defunct motor vehicle manufacturers of England
Defunct companies based in Sheffield